Alexander Cockburn was a political journalist.

Alexander Cockburn may also refer to:

Sir Alexander Cockburn, 12th Baronet (1802–1880), Scottish lawyer, politician, and judge
Sir Alexander Cockburn, 6th Baronet (1710–1739) of the Cockburn baronets
Sir Alexander Cockburn, 7th Baronet (1739–1745) of the Cockburn baronets
Alexander de Cockburn, Great Seal of Scotland
Alexander Peter Cockburn (1837–1905), Ontario businessman and political figure

See also
Alex Coburn, fictional character
Cockburn (surname)
Cockburn baronets#Ancestors of the Cockburn baronets